Patrick Read Johnson (born May 7, 1962) is an American filmmaker, special effects artist and screenwriter. Born in Wadsworth, Illinois, he is best known for his directorial work on the films Spaced Invaders, Angus, Baby's Day Out, The Genesis Code and 5-25-77.  He also has written and produced such films as Dragonheart.

Career
Starting out in the field of practical special effects and models, Johnson was one of the first people outside of Industrial Light and Magic to see Star Wars (albeit in an incomplete form) as chronicled in his semi-autobiographical film 5-25-77. He first saw the film during Spring Break, sometime between late March and early April 1977, when ILM was scrambling to complete VFX shots. He had also visited the set of Close Encounters of the Third Kind at Future General Corporation a few days before and found Douglas Trumbull's work to be "engineered, intimidating and mature" compared to John Dykstra's "shooting-from-the-hip" style.

Johnson ascended into mainstream Hollywood filmmaking following the modest success of Spaced Invaders, invited by John Hughes to work on his adaptation of Dennis the Menace, and then later, the comedy Baby's Day Out. Baby's Day Out was tremendously popular in South Asia, including India, Pakistan, Sri Lanka and Bangladesh. In India, it was played at the largest theater in Calcutta for over a year.

He also wrote the fantasy film Dragonheart, which spawned a franchise. He proposed the idea for the film to producer Raffaella De Laurentiis. Johnson described it as "The Skin Game with a dragon in it...or Butch Cassidy and the Sundance Dragon", and that he wanted "the idea of a dragon and a knight conning villages for money" because he thought that the concept was "not only funny, but kind of sweet".

Up until 2021 Johnson served as a filmmaking instructor at the University of North Carolina School of the Arts.

5-25-77
Johnson began developing 5-25-77 in 1999 after he  met Gary Kurtz. In 2001, Johnson began seeking funding for 5-25-77, and didn't start shooting the film until 2004.  An incomplete "preview cut" was exhibited in 2007 at Star Wars Celebration IV  and at the Hamptons International Film Festival in 2008, where 5-25-77 won the Heineken Red Star Award.

On May 25, 2012, the 35th anniversary of the release of Star Wars, Johnson began a cross-country road trip in his 1975 Ford Pinto to attract the funding needed to finish the film's remaining post-production work. Johnson spent the summer of 2012 test-screening 5-25-77, his trip also becoming the subject of a documentary called Hearts of Dorkness, by filmmaker Morgan Flores.

In 2013, Toronto International Film Festival'''s Next Wave Film Festival invited Johnson to show 5-25-77'' as a "work in progress", the attention from the festival Johnson attributed to the bid of his promotional tour the summer before.

In 2017, it was announced Johnson had completed the film and that it would receive a limited theatrical release on May 25.

References

External links

1952 births
Living people
American directors
American male screenwriters
Film directors from Illinois
Male screenwriters
People from Wadsworth, Illinois
Screenwriters from Illinois
Writers from Chicago